Wynberg is a suburb of Johannesburg, South Africa. It is located in Johannesburg's Region E of the City of Johannesburg Metropolitan Municipality. It has been called Johannesburg's worst named suburb, as it is not a leafy, vine covered enclave with a mountain view, but rather a built-up area with wall-to-wall factories.

References

Johannesburg Region E